William O. Trott (born 20 March 1965) is a Bermudian sprinter. He competed in the 100 metres at the 1984 Summer Olympics and the 1988 Summer Olympics.

References

1965 births
Living people
Athletes (track and field) at the 1984 Summer Olympics
Athletes (track and field) at the 1988 Summer Olympics
Bermudian male sprinters
Olympic athletes of Bermuda
Athletes (track and field) at the 1987 Pan American Games
Pan American Games competitors for Bermuda
Place of birth missing (living people)